Crocidophora tienmushana is a moth in the family Crambidae. It was described by Aristide Caradja and Edward Meyrick in 1935. It is found in Zhejiang, China.

References

Moths described in 1935
Pyraustinae